Ripen is the second studio album by American singer-songwriter Shawn McDonald. The album was released on March 7, 2006 on Sparrow Records. This album was produced by Will Hunt and Christopher Stevens. The album attained commercial charting successes and critical acclamation.

Background
The second studio album from American-Christian musician Shawn McDonald is entitled "Ripen". This album was released by Sparrow Records of March 7, 2006. It was produced by Will Hunt and Christopher Stevens.

Critical reception

Ripen garnered critical acclaim from eight music critics ratings and reviews. At CCM Magazine, John J. Thompson graded the album an A, stating that "Ripen proves that McDonald is a creative force to be reckoned with." Jared Johnson of AllMusic rated the album four-and-a-half stars, writing that "Ripen showed enough growth to widen McDonald's group of core listeners well beyond the coffeehouse crowd", and that the release is "extremely likeable". At Christianity Today, Christa Banister rated the album four stars, saying that while having the flu his best track on the album is the last cut, which "best demonstrate his creative vision and potential". Founder Tony Cummings of Cross Rhythms rated the album nine squares, stating that with the multitudes of singer-songwriter albums to review that he doubts he'll "hear a better album than this." At Melodic, Pär Winberg rated the album four stars, writing that "This is a really good record." Spencer Priest of Jesus Freak Hideout rated the album four stars, saying that "Ripen is a solid achievement from a remarkably talented musician." At Christian Broadcasting Network, Jennifer E. Jones rated the album four-and-a-half spins, writing that the album shows growth as an artist for McDonald, and says that it is "Very much an experience album, Ripen flows and takes you on a journey from track to track." Founder Kevin McNeese of New Release Tuesday rated the album three-and-a-half stars, saying that "In an effort to simplify his music, Shawn's lyrics take on almost a repetitive nature with chorus consisting of few words, however, the worshipful style continues to impress and expectations are high for his third album."

Commercial performance
For the Billboard charting week of March 25, 2006, Roots was the No. 116 most sold album in the entirety of the United States by the Billboard 200, and it was the No. 3 most sold Top Christian Album. On the breaking and entry chart Top Heatseekers Albums, it was the No. 2 most sold.

Track listing

Charts

Album

Singles

References

Shawn McDonald albums
2006 albums